Fordham Priory was a Gilbertine priory in Fordham, Cambridgeshire, England. It was established in 1227 and was dissolved in 1540.

Fordham Abbey, a Grade II listed Georgian manor house was built on the site in the eighteenth century.

References

Monasteries in Cambridgeshire
1227 establishments in England
Christian monasteries established in the 13th century
1540 disestablishments in England
Gilbertine monasteries